The 2003 NCAA Division I women's volleyball tournament began on December 4, 2003 with 64 teams and ended December 18 when Southern California defeated Florida 3 games to 1 in Dallas, Texas for the program's third NCAA title and sixth national title overall.

It was Southern California's second consecutive NCAA title.  The team capped off the 2003 season undefeated at 35-0, becoming the third team in NCAA history to accomplish the feat, the first repeat NCAA national champion to go undefeated, and the first team in the NCAA era to be ranked #1 in the coaches poll for the entire season.

Florida made the school's first national championship match in the program's seventh final four appearance. Minnesota also made the program's first NCAA final four appearance.

Records
Three teams in the 2003 NCAA Volleyball Tournament qualified with either 0 or 1 losses: USC (29-0), Hawaii (32-1), and Florida (31-1). It is the most recent tournament to feature at least three such teams.

Lincoln Regional

Long Beach Regional

Gainesville Regional

Honolulu Regional

Final Four – Reunion Arena, Dallas, Texas

National Semifinals

Southern California vs. Minnesota

Minnesota, making their first NCAA Final Four appearance in program history, played top-seeded USC tough in the first two sets, falling 30-27, 30-28. USC rode the momentum in the third set, winning easily 30-20 to advance to the national championship match for the second consecutive year. USC's balanced attack consisted off three players with double digit kills, including Bibiana Candelas with 12, Keao Burdine with 13 and April Ross with 11. Minnesota was led by Cassie Busse with 23 kills and Erin Martin with 11.

Florida vs. Hawaii

Florida and Hawaii battled in the second semifinal, with Florida looking to advance to their first final in school history after being 0-for-6 in previous NCAA semifinals, while Hawaii was looking to advance to their first final since 1996.

Both teams played even in the first two games, but it was Florida who won them by the scores of 30-28, 30-28. Hawaii answered back after the break to win 30-23. The 30-23 loss was the first individual game the Gators lost since August 23, breaking their NCAA record of 105 straight game wins. Florida and Hawaii once again played even in the fourth set, but Hawaii was unable to force a fifth set as Florida won the fourth set, 30-28. Hawaii was paced by AVCA National Player of the Year Kim Willoughby and Lily Kahumoku who both had 21 kills.

National Championship: Southern California vs. Florida 

Florida started out the match well by winning the first set off of undefeated Southern California. USC answered back by taking the second set 30-27 and used a 6-0 run in the third set to win easily, 30-19. In the fourth set, USC never trailed and led 22-15 before Florida mounted a comeback to cut USC's lead to 25-23. USC did not let up and won the fourth and final set 30-26 to cap off an undefeated season at 35-0. Florida ended their season at 36-2 with their only other loss coming to USC in the season opening AVCA Showcase tournament.

References

NCAA Women's Volleyball Championship
NCAA
Sports competitions in Dallas
Volleyball in Texas
2003 in sports in Texas
December 2003 sports events in the United States